K. J. Maxi is the member of 14th Kerala Legislative Assembly. He represents Kochi constituency and belongs to Communist Party of India (Marxist).

Earlier, he served as the councillor at Kochi municipal corporation. K. J. Maxi started his political career through SFI. He was the state joint secretary SFI. Currently he is the CPI (M) District Committee Member and CITU District Committee Member.

References

Living people
Kerala MLAs 2016–2021
Politicians from Kochi
Communist Party of India (Marxist) politicians from Kerala
Year of birth missing (living people)